Pentwater Township is a civil township of Oceana County in the U.S. state of Michigan. The population was 1,513 at the 2000 census. The Village of Pentwater is located within the township.

Geography

Demographics
As of the census of 2000, there were 1,513 people, 712 households, and 481 families residing in the township. The racial makeup of the township was 96.70% White, 0.20% African American, 0.46% Native American, 0.33% Asian, 0.20% Pacific Islander, 0.59% from other races, and 1.52% from two or more races. Hispanic or Latino of any race were 2.12% of the population.

There were 712 households, out of which 19.0% had children under the age of 18 living with them, 58.4% were married couples living together, 6.7% had a female householder with no husband present, and 32.4% were non-families. 29.4% of all households were made up of individuals, and 14.2% had someone living alone who was 65 years of age or older.  The average household size was 2.12 and the average family size was 2.56.

In the township the population was spread out, with 16.6% under the age of 18, 5.3% from 18 to 24, 16.1% from 25 to 44, 34.4% from 45 to 64, and 27.6% who were 65 years of age or older.  The median age was 52 years. For every 100 females, there were 92.2 males.  For every 100 females age 18 and over, there were 89.5 males.

The median income for a household in the township was $42,574, and the median income for a family was $47,875. Males had a median income of $37,500 versus $26,250 for females. The per capita income for the township was $23,837.  About 5.9% of families and 7.4% of the population were below the poverty line, including 11.6% of those under age 18 and 3.7% of those age 65 or over.

Notes

Further reading
Central Michigan University, Bibliography for Oceana County.
Hartwick, Louis M. Oceana County Pioneers and Business Men of Today. Pentwater, MI: Pentwater News Steam Printers, 1890.
History of Manistee, Mason and Oceana Counties, Michigan. . . Chicago, IL: H.R. Page & Co., 1882.
Olde Tyme Plat and History of Oceana County, Michigan. Hart, MI: Oceana County 4-H Youth Council and "Olde Tyme" Plat and History Committee, 1976.
Pentwater Bird's Eye View. Map, 1880.
Schrumpf, Florence R. Pentwater, 1853-1942. Pentwater, MI: Pentwater Historical Society, 1993

External links
Pentwater Chamber of Commerce
Pentwater, Lake, Fun and Sun
Pentwater Vacation Information
Pentwater Marina
Pentwater Cottage Rentals

Townships in Oceana County, Michigan
Townships in Michigan